Sandro Ferreira André Nascimento (born 1987) or Dodô  is a Brazilian footballer who most recently played as a midfielder for Turkish club Boluspor.

References 

1987 births
Living people
Brazilian footballers
Association football midfielders
Campeonato Brasileiro Série A players
TFF First League players
Qatar Stars League players
Atlético Clube Goianiense players
Associação Atlética Ponte Preta players
Giresunspor footballers
Qatar SC players
Expatriate footballers in Turkey
Expatriate footballers in Qatar
Brazilian expatriate sportspeople in Turkey
Brazilian expatriate sportspeople in Qatar
Sportspeople from Ceará